Torche was a French naval Etna-class ship-sloop launched in 1795. She participated in the action of 19 July 1805, with the Royal Navy capturing her one-month later, in August. She was taken into service as HMS Torch but never commissioned and was broken up in 1811.

Career and capture
From 2 June 1795, Torche served at Honfleur under Lieutenant Péronne.

On 9 February 1803, Torche, under Lieutenant Dehen the elder, departed Camaret, bound to Le Havre and Dunkirk. From there, she ferried troops to Santo Domingo, and transported general Pierre Quantin on her journey back to Cadiz, where she arrived on 27 November 1803.

On 19 July 1805 Torche, which was under the command of lieutenant Nicolas-Philippe Dehen, was part of a squadron of four vessels under François-André Baudin, that three days after they had left Martinique captured HMS Blanche off Puerto Rico. Torches companions were the 40-gun French frigate Topaze, the 22-gun corvette Départment des Landes, and the 16-gun brig Faune.

On 14 August, the 74-gun, third rate  was in the Channel Fleet when she saw a sail to eastward and three sail to westward. The lone sail was Faune, which trailed behind her squadron and had lost contact with it. Faune had on board as prisoners 22 men from Blanche.

The three remaining ships proceeded, but on the 16th, Torche was lagging behind and in danger of behind caught by Goliath, which had been joined by HMS Raisonnable. Deeming that waiting for Torche entailed accepting battle against the overwhelming British forces, Baudin ordered his squadron to take whatever actions were necessary for their security; this allowed Topaze and Départment des Landes to escape. Goliath caught up with Torche, which struck after a few shots from Goliath. Torche was carrying 52 men from the crew of Blanche. However, Topaze and Départment-des-Landes escaped.

Fate
The Royal Navy took Torche into service as HMS Torch. The Navy placed her in ordinary and there is no record of her ever being commissioned. She was broken up in 1811.

Citations

References
Duncan, Archibald (1806) The British trident; or, Register of naval actions, from ... the Spanish armada to the present time.
Fonds Marine. Campagnes (opérations; divisions et stations navales; missions diverses). Inventaire de la sous-série Marine BB4. Tome premier: BB210 à 482 (1805-18826) 

Walters, Samuel (1949) Memoirs of an Officer in Nelson's Navy. (Liverpool University Press). 
 

Sloops of the Royal Navy
Captured ships
1795 ships
Ships built in France
Etna-class corvettes